Kalbarri National Park is located  north of Perth, in the Mid West region of Western Australia.

Spectacular coastal cliffs are located on the coast near the mouth of the Murchison River and the town of Kalbarri.

Geography

Kalbarri National Park preserves the inland desert regions of red and white striped Tumblagooda sandstone east of the town of Kalbarri, particularly the lower reaches of the Murchison River and its gorge, as well as the mouth of the river by Meanarra Hill.

The coastal area contains several wind and water eroded rock formations including a sea stack and a natural bridge.

Climate
The park is open all year round though temperatures can be extremely high from December through April. The park lies in the northernmost limits of the transition zone between a Mediterranean and a semi-arid climate. Winters are warm with moderate precipitation. Summers are hot and dry with temperatures that frequently exceed  in the inland part of the park. Inland areas can often be more than 10 °C (18 °F) higher than along the coast and in town. Monthly precipitation levels are low with most rain falling from May through August. Heavy rainfalls may cause the roads to the gorge to be closed.

Flora

The Kalbarri area is known for its diversity and extent of wildflowers. More than 800 species of wildflowers bloom from late winter through early summer with peak times in August and September. Twenty-one plant species are found only in the coastal cliff tops and gorge country predominantly in the National Park. One of the best known local plants is the Kalbarri catspaw, a small yellow or red plant that is usually seen on recently burnt country from August to September. Several orchids can only be seen in and near the park, including the Kalbarri spider orchid and the Murchison hammer orchid.

The small-petalled Beyeria or short-petalled Beyeria, once thought to be extinct, was re-discovered in the park in 1994. The population in the park is one of only three known populations.

Fauna

The park area has observation records for about 200 different animal species in the interior of the park along the Murchison River. More than 400 species have been recorded near the coast and around the town of Kalbarri. The threatened tammar wallaby was observed previously in the area but not lately.

Approximately 150 bird species have been observed including the emu (Dromaius novaehollandiae), osprey (Pandion haliaetus), wedge-tailed eagle (Aquila audax) and Australian pelican (Pelecanus conspicillatus). Some of the recorded mammal species in the interior include the western grey kangaroo (Macropus fuliginosus), short-beaked echidna (Tachyglossus aculeatus) and spinifex hopping mouse (Notomys alexis). The only observed bat in the park is the Finlayson's cave bat (Vespadelus finlaysoni). The recorded reptile species include the thorny devil (Moloch horridus), western bearded dragon (Pogona minor) and central netted dragon (Ctenophorus nuchalis). The only observed amphibian is Günther's toadlet (Pseudophryne guentheri). About 30 different arthropods have been recorded including a dragonfly called the Pilbara tiger (Ictinogomphus dobsoni) and the savanna black tree ant (Tetraponera punctulata).

Activities
The most popular activities are sightseeing, boating, fishing, picnicking and bushwalking. Other activities include abseiling in the gorge and horseback riding, as well as scuba diving, snorkelling, surfing and swimming in the Indian Ocean at Red Bluff Beach and the small beach at Pot Alley. From Kalbarri there are scenic cruises along the Murchison River and flights over Kalbarri National Park. Construction of the two Kalbarri Skywalk platforms are now completed and offer expansive views of the Murchison River Gorge and Kalbarri National Park.

Facilities
There are no campsites or other accommodations and no water available within the park boundaries. All overnight visitors must use the facilities in the town unless they are on a multi-day bushwalk or boat tour.

Features
Coastal part, starting from the town of Kalbarri and moving south:

 Red Bluff
 Mushroom Rock
 Rainbow Valley
 Pot Alley
 Eagle Gorge
 Shellhouse and Grandstand
 Island Rock
 Natural Bridge

Inland part, along the Murchison River Gorge:

 Nature's Window
 The Loop
 Z Bend
 Hawks Head
 Ross Graham Lookout

Galleries

See also

 Protected areas of Western Australia

References

External links

 EveryTrail travel site's guide for Kalbarri

National parks of Western Australia
Shire of Northampton
Protected areas established in 1963
Western Australian places listed on the defunct Register of the National Estate
1963 establishments in Australia
Kalbarri, Western Australia